Ambodibonara is a village and commune in the Mahanoro District, Atsinanana Region, Madagascar.

References

Populated places in Atsinanana